Justice T. V. R. Tatachari B.Sc., B.L. (16 October 1916 – 1 June 2001) was Chief Justice of Delhi High Court. He was a highly Stotriya Vaishnava Scholar and belonged to one of Srimat Tirumala families settled in Vizianagaram.

Justice T. V. R. Tatachari was appointed first Lokayukta of the state of Himachal Pradesh. Governor Urmilla Singh, Chief Minister P. K. Dhumal, Assembly Speaker Tulsi Ram and leader of the opposition Vidya Stokes, Acting Chief Justice of High Court R. B. Mishra, were among those present at the swearing in.

(It is a quasi-judicial body)

Himachal Pradesh was one of the first states to appoint Lokayukta in 1983 when the then government headed by Chief Minister V. B. Singh passed the Lokayukta Act.

He graduated (BSc) from Maharajah's College, Vizianagaram in 1935 and completed a Bachelor of Law degree from University of Madras in 1938. He was enrolled as Advocate in the High Court of Madras on 26 February 1940 and practiced in the Madras High Court. He was appointed part-time Lecturer in the Faculty of Law of the Delhi University in November 1963.  Soon after he was appointed Judge of the Delhi High Court on 4 January 1967. On 4 June 1974 he was appointed the Chief Justice of Delhi High Court. He retired on 16 October 1978.

During his tenure as Chief Justice, a new building of the Delhi High Court was inaugurated in New Delhi by President of India Dr. Fakhruddin Ali Ahmed on 26 September 1976. In 1983, he was called out of retirement to serve as the first Lokayukta of Himachal Pradesh and was deputed to Shimla where he served for four years. Subsequent to that role he retired and continued to stay at his New Delhi residence until his death on 1 June 2001.

References

External links
 Biodata of T. V. R. Tatachari at Delhi High Court website.

Telugu people
1916 births
2001 deaths
20th-century Indian judges
Chief Justices of the Delhi High Court